Morunasaurus peruvianus, known commonly as the Cenepa  manticore, is a species of lizard in the family Hoplocercidae. The species is endemic to Peru.

References

Morunasaurus
Endemic fauna of Peru
Reptiles of Peru
Reptiles described in 2003
Taxa named by Gunther Köhler